Bembidion constrictum is a species of ground beetle in the family Carabidae. It is found in North America.

Subspecies
These three subspecies belong to the species Bembidion constrictum:
 Bembidion constrictum civile Casey
 Bembidion constrictum constrictum
 Bembidion constrictum vernula Casey

References

Further reading

 

constrictum
Articles created by Qbugbot
Beetles described in 1847